Elections to Ballymoney Borough Council were held on 19 May 1993 on the same day as the other Northern Irish local government elections. The election used three district electoral areas to elect a total of 16 councillors.

There was no change from the prior election.

Election results

Note: "Votes" are the first preference votes.

Districts summary

|- class="unsortable" align="centre"
!rowspan=2 align="left"|Ward
! % 
!Cllrs
! % 
!Cllrs
! %
!Cllrs
! %
!Cllrs
!rowspan=2|TotalCllrs
|- class="unsortable" align="center"
!colspan=2 bgcolor="" | DUP
!colspan=2 bgcolor="" | UUP
!colspan=2 bgcolor="" | SDLP
!colspan=2 bgcolor="white"| Others
|-
|align="left"|Ballymoney Town
|bgcolor="#D46A4C"|36.6
|bgcolor="#D46A4C"|2
|29.5
|2
|0.0
|0
|33.9
|1
|5
|-
|align="left"|Bann Valley
|bgcolor="#D46A4C"|34.2
|bgcolor="#D46A4C"|2
|31.9
|2
|26.1
|1
|7.8
|0
|6
|-
|align="left"|Bushvale
|32.8
|2
|bgcolor="40BFF5"|39.4
|bgcolor="40BFF5"|2
|27.8
|1
|0.0
|0
|5
|-
|- class="unsortable" class="sortbottom" style="background:#C9C9C9"
|align="left"| Total
|34.5
|6
|33.5
|6
|18.9
|3
|13.1
|1
|16
|-
|}

Districts results

Ballymoney Town

1989: 2 x DUP, 2 x UUP, 1 x Independent
1993: 2 x DUP, 2 x UUP, 1 x Independent
1989-1993 Change: No change

Bann Valley

1989: 2 x DUP, 2 x UUP, 2 x SDLP
1993: 2 x DUP, 2 x UUP, 2 x SDLP
1989-1993 Change: No change

Bushvale

1989: 2 x UUP, 2 x DUP, 1 x SDLP
1993: 2 x UUP, 2 x DUP, 1 x SDLP
1989-1993 Change: No change

References

Ballymoney Borough Council elections
Ballymoney